Special somatic afferent fibers (SSA) are the afferent nerve fibers that carry information from the special senses of vision, smell, hearing and balance. The cranial nerves containing SSA fibers are the olfactory nerve (I), optic nerve (II) and the vestibulocochlear nerve (VIII). The term "SSA" also encompasses both special somatic and special visceral afferent fibers.

References

External links
 Overview at mmi.mcgill.ca

Neuroanatomy